Raniera Ellison (13 February 1915–29 March 1974) was a New Zealand fishing company manager. He was born on 13 February 1915.

References

1915 births
1974 deaths
Ngāi Tahu people
Kāti Māmoe people
Ellison family